Gone Are the Days! or Purlie Victorious is a 1963 American comedy-drama film starring Ossie Davis, Ruby Dee and Godfrey Cambridge. It is based on the 1961 Broadway play Purlie Victorious, which was written by Davis. He, Dee, Cambridge, Beah Richards, Sorrell Booke and Alan Alda (in his film debut), reprised their roles from the play.

Cast
 Ossie Davis as Reverend Purlie Victorious Judson
 Ruby Dee as Lutiebelle Gussie Mae Jenkins
 Godfrey Cambridge as Gitlow Judson
 Hilda Haynes as Missy Judson
 Beah Richards as Idella Landy
 Alan Alda as Charlie Cotchipee
 Charles Welch as Sheriff
 Ralph Roberts as Deputy
 Sorrell Booke as Ol' Cap', Stonewall Jackson Cotchipee

Reception
The New York Times review stated "The cancers of segregation, blind bigotry and Uncle Tom were made funny but real, and therefore howlingly effective, by the dual artistry of playwright-star Ossie Davis. As a Negro seeing his people and their tormentors comically plain, he filled the stage with humor, insight and passion." The critic noted, however, that "Mr. Davis's manufactured folk tale has, with the passage of just two years and the shedding of blood in Birmingham, lost some of its laughter. And the somewhat static quality of Nicholas Webster's direction, which clings to stage techniques, is not much of a help."

References

External links

Further reading
 Sieving, Christopher J. Soul Searching: Black-Themed Cinema from the March on Washington to the Rise of Blaxploitation, Wesleyan University Press (2011). 280pp. https://www.amazon.com/Soul-Searching-Black-Themed-Washington-Blaxploitation/dp/0819571334

1963 films
1963 comedy-drama films
African-American films
American black-and-white films
American comedy-drama films
American films based on plays
American satirical films
Films about race and ethnicity
Films about racism
Films set in Georgia (U.S. state)
Films directed by Nicholas Webster
1960s English-language films
1960s American films